was the Imperial capital of Japan for sixteen years, between 694 and 710. It was located in Yamato Province (present-day Kashihara in Nara Prefecture), having been moved from nearby Asuka.

As of 2006, ongoing excavations have revealed construction on the site of Fujiwara-kyō as early as 682, near the end of the reign of Emperor Tenmu.  With a brief halt upon Emperor Tenmu's death, construction resumed under Empress Jitō, who officially moved the capital in 694. Fujiwara-kyō remained the capital for the reigns of Emperor Monmu and Empress Genmei, but in 710 the Imperial court moved to the Heijō Palace in Nara, beginning the Nara period.

History
The palace occupied a plot measuring about 1 km2, and was surrounded by walls roughly 5 m high. Each of the four walls had three gates; Suzakumon, the main gate, stood at the center of the south wall. The  and other palace buildings were the first palace structures in Japan to have a tile roof in the Chinese style.

The area had previously been the domain of the Nakatomi clan, who oversaw the observation of Shintō rituals and ceremonies on behalf of the Imperial court. The city burnt down in 711, one year after the move to Nara, and was not rebuilt. Archaeological excavations began in 1934, and some portions of the palace were reconstructed. Close to 10,000 wooden tablets, known as mokkan, have been found, inscribed with Chinese characters.

This waka poem, written by Empress Jitō, describes Fujiwara in the summer:

Empress Genmei (661–721) moved the capital from Fujiwara-kyō to Nara (then Heijō-kyō) in 710 mainly to carry out the wishes of her son Emperor Monmu (683–707), who was the previous occupant of the throne and had ordered in 697 to search for a new proper capital site. According to Delmer Brown, the reason for Monmu to found a new capital may be that he was influenced by the ancient belief that a new Emperor should reign at a new capital and that Nara was intended to be the capital for his son Shōmu.

See also
 Fujiwara clan
 Yamato Sanzan

References
 Frederic, Louis (2002). "Japan Encyclopedia." Cambridge, Massachusetts: Harvard University Press.

External links
 
 Exhibition Room of Fujiwara Imperial Site

690 establishments
Former capitals of Japan
Asuka period
Planned capitals
Special Historic Sites